In addition to formal demonyms, many nicknames are used for residents of the different regions of the United Kingdom. For example, natives and residents of Liverpool are formally referred to as Liverpudlians, but are most commonly referred to as Scousers (after their local dish). Some, but not all, of these nicknames may be derogatory.

A - B 
 Aberdeen  Dorics, Donians or Teuchters.  Football team are nicknamed The Dons
 Arbroath  Red Lichties or Lichties, Codheids 
 Basingstoke  Bas Vegans after Bas Vegas , Basingjoker , Stokie
 Barnsley  Barnzolians, Tykes, Colliers (a former mining community), Dingles (by people from Sheffield)
 Barrow in Furness  Shipbuilders
 Belfast  McCooeys, Dunchers
 Beverley  Bevsters
 Birkenhead  Plastic Scousers (or Plazzies)
 Birmingham  Brummies
 Black Country  Yam Yams, Nineheads
 Blackburn  Horse Botherers (by people from Burnley and other Lancashire towns, after bestiality convictions)
 Blackpool Sand Grown 'Uns, Donkey Lashers, Seasiders
 Bolton  Trotters (originally a football term, it is now used to describe anyone from Bolton and surrounding area), Noblot (acronym)
 Bournemouth 
 Coffin Dodgers (due its popularity as a retirement area)
 Bramley  Villagers (by people from other areas of Leeds) 
 Brighton  Jugs (archaic)
 Bristol  Wurzels
 Britain  Limeys in Canada and the United States : Pommies in Australia and New Zealand : Les Rosbifs in France 
Tommy, Island Monkey in Germany
 Burnley  Burnleyites, Dingles (by people from other Lancashire towns, notably Blackburn)
 Bury  Shakers (originally a football term, it is now used to describe anyone from Bury and surrounding area)

C - D 
 Caernarfon  Cofi
 Caithness  Gallach
 Cambridge  Fenners, Swamp People
 Carlisle  Gimps, Gilligans
 Ceredigion  Cardi
 Chatham  Chavs
Chesterfield  Spireites, Chessies
Cleethorpes  Meggies
Colchester  Colchies, Romans, Camuloonies, Steamies, Castlers, Cross 'n' Crowners (after Colchester's coat of arms).
Corby  Plastic Jocks
Cornwall  Kernowicks, Merry-Jacks, Mera-Jacks, Uncle Jacks or Cousin Jacks (when abroad).
Crawley  Creepy Crawlies, Insects
Darlington  Quakers, Darloids, DCs, Monte Darlo
Derby Bockers, Sheep Shaggers, Rams
Devon Janners
Dingwall  Gudgie
Doncaster  Flatlanders (especially by people from Sheffield), Knights, Doleites
Dorchester  Dorchvegas
Dorset  Dorset Knobs (from the famous biscuit), Dumplings
Dover  Dover Sharks
Droitwich Spa  Monners
Dumfries  Doonhamers
Duns  Dingers
Durham  Durhamites, Posh Mackems, Posh Geordies, Cuddies, Pit Yackers (due to Durham's mining heritage)

E – G 
 Eastbourne  Winnicks or Willicks (dialect name of a guillemot or wild person)
 Edinburgh  Edinburgers or Edinbourgeois (used more so when referring to people from more affluent suburbs of Edinburgh), Dunediner (Gaelic Origin), Toonies (Scots)
 England  Sassenachs (offensive, used by Scottish and Irish; Anglicised form of the Scottish Gaelic word "sasunnach", meaning "Saxon"), Red Coats, Inglish, Nigels, Guffies (in Northeast Scotland), Sais (Welsh), Englandshire (in Scotland), The Shire (in Scotland)
 Essex  Essex Calves (archaic), Easties, Essers, Wideboys, Saxons, Scimitars (from the county Coat of Arms)
 Fleetwood  Codheads
 Forest of Dean  Foresters, Deaners, Offers
 Fraserburgh  Brochers, not to be confused with people from Burghead
 Frodsham  Jowie Heads (from old Runcorn area Cheshire meaning turnip, reference to the rural position of the town)
 Galashiels  Pale Merks (from the claim that Gala was the last major town in Scotland to have plumbing/running water)
 Glasgow  Keelies, Weegies
 Goole  Goolies
 Grimsby  Codheads, Haddocks, Grimmies
 Gillingham, Kent Medwayers
 Gosport, Hampshire  Turk Towners
 Great Yarmouth  Yarcos
 Guisborough  Woollybacks

H - K  
 Hampshire  Hampshire Hogs, Bacon Faces (reference to Hampshire as a pig-raising county in former times)
 Hartlepool  Monkey Hangers, Poolies 
 Hawick  Teri
 Haydock  Yickers
 Heywood  Monkeys
 Highlands and Islands (of Scotland)  Teuchters, used by other Scots and sometimes applied by Greater Glasgow natives to anyone speaking in a dialect other than Glaswegian
 Hinckley  Tin Hatters
 Huddersfield  Dog Botherers
 Hull  Codheads, Hully Gullies, 'Ullites
 Inverness  Sneckies
 Ipswich  Tractor Boys, Carrot Crunchers
 Irthlingborough  Irthlings
 Isle of Wight  Caulkheads (named after the caulking of boats)
 Kettering  Sheep shaggers, Ketteringers pansies
 Kilbarchan  Habbie

L 
 Lancashire  Yonners (specifically south-eastern Lancashire around the Oldham and Rochdale areas)
 Leeds  Loiners 
 Leicester  Rat Eyes (from the Roman name for the city: Ratae), Chisits (from the pronunciation of "how much is it," which sounds like "I'm a chisit"); Foxes, Bin Dippers (named after Foxes)
 Leicestershire  Leicesterites, Bean Bellies (from the eating of broad beans)
 Leigh  Lobby Gobblers, Leythers
 Lincolnshire  Yellow Bellies (after a species of frog common in the Lincolnshire and East Anglian Fens)
 Linlithgow  Black Bitch, from the burgh coat of arms
 Littlehampton  LA, from the local accent being unable to pronounce the 'h' in Hampton
 Liverpool  Scousers (from the stew known as scouse), 
Plastic Scousers or Plazzies (a person who falsely claims to be from Liverpool),
Woolybacks or Wools (a person from the surrounding areas of Liverpool, especially St Helens, Warrington, Widnes, or the Wirral)
 Llanelli  Turks 
 London  Londoners, Cockneys (Traditionally those born within the sound of the bells of St Mary le Bow, Cheapside) 
 Lossiemouth  Codheids 
 Louth  Luddites
 Luton  Hatters

M - N 
 Manchester  Manc, the shortened version of the demonym Mancunians
 Mansfield, Nottinghamshire  Scabs - offensive, linked to the divisions during the UK miners' strike (1984–1985)
 Malmesbury  Jackdaws
 Middlesbrough  Smoggies.
 Montrose  Gable Endies
 Nantwich  Dabbers
 Neath  Abbey-Jacks, Blacks, Blackjacks.
 Newcastle upon Tyne  Geordies
 Norfolk  Norfolk Dumplings ("Dumplings being a favourite food in that county")
 Northampton  Cobblers, after the ancient shoe industry that thrived in the town. 
 Northern Ireland  Paddies, Huns (sectarian offensive term for pro-British Unionists), Taigs (sectarian offensive term for pro-Irish Nationalists)
 North Shields, Tyne and Wear  Cods Heeds, Fish Nabbers
 North Wales  Gogs
 Northwich  Salter Boys
 Norwich Canaries
 Nottingham Boggers, Scabs (insult; see Mansfield)
 Nuneaton, Warwickshire Codders, Treacle Towners

O - R 
 Oldham  Yonners (from Oldham pronunciation of 'yonder' as in 'up yonner'), Roughyeds, Biffos
 Paisley  Buddies,
Peterhead Bluemogganers, Blue Tooners
Plymouth Janners. Originally a person who spoke with a Devon accent, now simply any West Countryman. In naval slang (where the place is referred to as Guz), this is specifically a person from Plymouth.
Portsmouth  Pompey (shared by the city, the naval base and the football club), Skates
Redcar  Codheads
Rotherham Chuckles, Rotherbirds
Royston, Hertfordshire Crows
Rye Mudlarks

S 
 St Helens  Woollybacks
 Scarborough  Algerinos, Scarborians, Bottom-enders (for those born or raised in the old town)
 Scotland  Scotties, Jocks Macs, Sweaties (offensive; from rhyming slang "Sweaty Sock" for Jock).
 Selkirk  Souters
 Shavington  Tramps
 Sheffield  Dee Dars, Steelmekkers.
 Sheringham  Shannock
 Shrewsbury  Salopians or Salops
 Skye  Sgitheanachs
 Southampton  Scum(mers)
 South Shields  Sand Dancers
 Southern England  Southern Fairies, Shandy Drinkers 
 Southport  Sandgrounders, Groundies
 Stalybridge  Stalyvegas
 Stockport  Stopfordians (from an old name for Stockport), Hatters
 Stoke-on-Trent  Potters, Clay Heads, Stokies, Jug Heads, kidsgrove spiders,
 Strood  Long Tails, Stroodles
 Stroud  Stroudies
 Sunderland  Mackems
 Sutherland  Cattach
 Swansea  Jacks, Swansea Jacks
 Swindon  Moonrakers

T - V 
 Tarbert, Loch Fyne  Dookers (named after guillemot and razorbill, sea-birds once a popular food among Tarbert natives)
 Teesside  Smoggies, 'Boro Boys (after Middlesbrough)
 Teignmouth  Muffians
 Telford  Telfies, Chavs

W 
 Wales  Taffs [Mid/West Welsh] (sometimes considered offensive), Taffies. 
 Wallingford, Oxfordshire  Wallies
 Walsall  Saddlers
 Warrington  Wire, Wirepullers (after the local wire industry),  Woolybacks or Wools (in Liverpool)
 Welshpool  Soup Heads
 Westhoughton Keawyeds (Cowheads, after local legend)
 West Riding of Yorkshire  Wessies (in other parts of Yorkshire)
 Weymouth and Portland  Kimberlins (Portland name for a person from Weymouth)
 Weymouth  Weybiza (due to the wild nightlife the town has adopted)
 Whitehaven  Marras, Jam Eaters, Wetties
 Widnes  Woolybacks or Wools (in Liverpool)
 Wigan  Pie-eaters, Pie-noshers, Purrers
 Wiltshire  Moonrakers
 Wolverhampton  Yam Yams (from local dialect where people say "Yam" meaning "Yow am" meaning "You are")
 Worthing  Pork Bolters
 Workington  Jam Eaters
 Whitby  Codheads

Y - Z 
 York  Yorkies, Old Yorkers
 Yorkshire  Tykes, Yorkies, Yorkie Bars

See also 
 List of regional nicknames
 Lists of nicknames – nickname list articles on Wikipedia
 Demonym

Citations

References 
 
 
 
 

Nicknames
Regional nicknames
British